Seaborough is a small village and civil parish in the county of Dorset in southwest England. The parish was previously part of the hundred of Crewkerne, but was transferred to within Dorset in 1896. In 2013 the estimated population of the civil parish was 60.

The village church is small and mostly not of ancient construction. Ralph Wightman, broadcaster, agriculturist and a native of Dorset, described it as "delightful", and claimed that the round arch of the porch was so low it "would remove the hat of any man of average height."

Seaborough lies on the northern side of the Axe valley, beneath the  Seaborough Hill. The minor lane which passes through the village and up the hill is noted for being particularly steep. At the bottom of the village the river is crossed by a small stone bridge, close to which is an old ducking pool, into which scolding wives would historically have been dipped in an attempt to 'cure' them of their condition.

In March 2013 a fire at the  piggery at Seaborough Manor destroyed the building and killed about nine hundred pigs. Fifty firefighters took about three hours to tackle the blaze.

References

External links

Civil parishes in Dorset
Villages in Dorset
Places formerly in Somerset